Orthogonius latus is a species of ground beetle in the subfamily Orthogoniinae. It was described by Hope in 1842.

References

latus
Beetles described in 1842